Shim Eui-sik ( born December 5, 1969) is a former professional ice hockey forward. He was the first player to reach 100 goals and 100 points in Korean ice hockey history.

After 4 years of University (Yeon-Sae) he signed with Anyang Halla and played for his whole career (1994–2006). He retired in 2006. Shim also played for the Korean national team from 1994 to 2004. The team retired his number 91, in 2007. The Korean media have referred to him as the 'Korean version of Gretzky'.

On April 24, 2008, Shim became the team's 4th head coach in Franchise history. He was named the "Coach of the Event" in the 2009 Korea Domestic Championship which saw Halla take top honours.

On March 28, 2010, Anyang Halla became the first non-Japanese club to win Asia League post-season title.

Coaching Record (AL Hockey 2008–2014) 

complete records for previous seasons

*prior to the 2008–2009 season, there were no shoot-outs and games ended in a tie

Player statistics

References

External links

1969 births
HL Anyang players
Living people
South Korean ice hockey forwards
Asian Games bronze medalists for South Korea
Medalists at the 1990 Asian Winter Games
Ice hockey players at the 1990 Asian Winter Games
Ice hockey players at the 1996 Asian Winter Games
Ice hockey players at the 1999 Asian Winter Games
Ice hockey players at the 2003 Asian Winter Games
Asian Games medalists in ice hockey
Competitors at the 1989 Winter Universiade
Competitors at the 1991 Winter Universiade
Competitors at the 1997 Winter Universiade